Gamma Volantis, Latinized from γ Volantis, is a wide binary star system in the southern constellation of Volans. Based upon parallax measurements, it is approximately 133 light years from Earth. It is bright enough to be seen with the naked eye and can be found around 9° to the east-southeast of the Large Magellanic Cloud.

The brighter component, designated γ2 Volantis, is an orange K-type giant star with a stellar classification of K0 III and an apparent magnitude of +3.62, making this the brightest star in the constellation. Its companion, γ1 Volantis, is an F-type main-sequence star of classification F2 V and an apparent magnitude of +5.70. As of 2002, the pair were at an angular separation of 14.1 along a position angle of 296°. Their separation has decreased from 15.7 in 1826.

References

External links
 

K-type giants
F-type main-sequence stars
Binary stars

Volans (constellation)
Volantis, Gamma
Durchmusterung objects
055864 5
034473 81
2735 6